FC Gori is a Georgian association football club, based in Gori, which competes in Liga 3, the third tier of Georgian football system.

History
Established in 2015, FC Gori to this day retains the status of a municipal non-commercial legal entity. Currently they are the only club to have been in the third division for the seventh successive season.

The team achieved their best result in Liga 3 in 2016 when they won the tournament after an unbeaten run during the entire season. But in this transitional season all group winners were denied promotion.  

FC Gori came close to Liga 2 again in 2020, when they earned a place in play-offs against Merani Martvili. After a goalless draw at home the events in the return leg unfolded unfavourably for Gori when they were reduced to ten men already in the first half with another player sent off later on. This circumstance defined a final outcome of the match.

    
In David Kipiani Cup Gori achieved a remarkable success in 2017 after they knocked out Erovnuli Liga team Shukura Kobuleti in the second round. The next year the club was eliminated by Torpedo Kutaisi, the Cup winners of the season, and in 2021 was beaten in extra-time by Samgurali, the finalists of the last two competitions.  

Around 80% of the current players are local residents, brought up at the football school of Gori.

Current squad
As of April 2022

 (C)

Honours
• Liga 3

Winners (1): 2016 (Group Centre)

Third place (1): 2020

Managers
Davit Shubitidze worked as head coach for six seasons starting from 2016. He was replaced by Vladimer Eliauri before the 2022 season.

Stadium
Built in 1978, stadium Kartli is located between two IDP settlements in Gori. It has the capacity of 1,500 seats. Until 2012 it was home of Spartaki Tskhinvali.

References

External links
Official website
Profile on Soccerway
Page in Facebook

Football clubs in Georgia (country)
Association football clubs established in 2015